Jaromír Nohavica or Jarek Nohavica (born 7 June 1953, in Ostrava) is a Czech recording artist, songwriter, lyricist and poet.

Early life
He was born in Ostrava and has played guitar since he was 13. He began studies at the Technical University of Ostrava but eventually left the school. He tried various jobs, including as a freelance lyricist. He gained fame with his first song for Marie Rottrová, Lásko, voníš deštěm (You Smell of Rain, My Love; actually a cover version of the song She's Gone by Black Sabbath). He lives in Ostrava with his wife and two children.

Career 
In 1982, he started performing in public, and his songs gained popularity. His first album, Darmoděj (The Wastrel), released in 1988, sold out immediately. A mythical aura arose around Nohavica which survived even the crisis period of his treatment for alcoholism. He released the somewhat pessimistic Mikymauzoleum (Mickey Mausoleum), an album containing mainly melancholic songs. 

Meanwhile, from 1986 he was a collaborator of the StB, secret police force in communist Czechoslovakia.

In 1994, he recorded a live album, Tři čuníci (Three Piglets), intended for children, with humorous songs.

In 1996, Nohavica released Divné století (Strange Century). He and his producer employed new instruments and voices for the new songs on the album, which became a huge success. Two years later the Jaromir Nohavica and Kapela (i.e. the Band) came out with Koncert (Concert), a record featuring Nohavica playing with a band, which recognizably changed his music. The album contains mainly older material, but his treatment gave it a new appeal. His studio album from 2000, Moje smutné srdce (My Sad Heart), contained mostly sad songs about love.

Nohavica also starred in Petr Zelenka's movie Rok Ďábla (Year of the Devil), which was awarded the main prize at the 37th Karlovy Vary International Film Festival in 2002 and several other international film festivals. He translated the Polish musical Painted on Glass for Divadlo Na Fidlovačce and poeticized Mozart's opera Così fan tutte for the National Moravian-Silesian Theatre.

He has enjoyed popularity in neighbouring Poland and Slovakia, as well as Czech Republic.

In 2007, Czech singer-songwriter Jaroslav Hutka accused Nohavica of having collaborated with the StB (the Communist-era Czechoslovak secret police). Documents released the previous year indicated that in the 1980s, Nohavica had met two exponents of the Czechoslovak exile culture Karel Kryl and Pavel Kohout in Austria, and had informed the police about their activities.

Discography

Extended play records 

 Cesty (Roads) (EP, Panton 1985)
 Písně pro V. V. (Songs for V. V.) (2 EPs, Panton 1988)

Albums 
 Darmoděj ("Aimless", live album, 1988)
 Osmá barva duhy ("The Eighth Color of the Rainbow", live album, 1989)
 V tom roce pitomém ("In That Stupid Year", live album, 1990)
 Mikymauzoleum ("Mickeymausoleum", studio album, 1993)
 Tři čuníci ("The Three Piglets", live album, 1994)
 Darmoděj a další ("Aimless and others", studio album, 1995)
 Divné století ("A Strange Century", studio album, 1996)
 Koncert ("The Concert", live album, 1998)
 Moje smutné srdce ("My Sad Heart", studio album, 2000)
 Babylon (studio album, 2003)
 Pražská pálená ("Prague Brandy", live album, 2005, available for free download on nohavica.cz)
 Doma ("At Home", live album, 2006)
 Ikarus ("Icarus", live album, 2008)
 Z podia - On the Road 2008 ("From the Stage - On the Road 2008", live album, 2008, available for free download on nohavica.cz)
 V Lucerně ("In the Lantern ", live album, 2009)
 Virtuálky ("Virtuallies", studio album, 2009, available for free download on nohavica.cz)
 Virtuálky 2 ("Virtuallies 2", studio album, 2010, available for free download on nohavica.cz)
 Virtuálky 3 ("Virtuallies 3", studio album, 2011, available for free download on nohavica.cz)
 Tak mě tu máš ("So Here You Have Me", studio album, 2012)
 Tenkrát ("Back Then", compilation album, 2013)
 Jarek Nohavica a přátelé ("Jarek Nohavica and Friends", live album, 2014)
 Poruba ("Glade", studio album, 2017)
 V Gongu ("In the Gong ", live album, 2018)
 Máma mi na krk dala klíč ("Mom Put a Key Around My Neck", studio album, 2020)

Other appearances
2006: Strážce plamene with Petr Hapka & Michal Horáček
2007: Strážce plamene v obrazech with Hapka & Horáček
2011: Tante Cose da Veder with Hapka, Horáček & Ondřej Brzobohatý

Notes and references
 Lucerna and Gong'' ("The Lantern" and "The Gong") are names of the establishments where the corresponding albums were performed and recorded.

External links 
  (Czech, English, Polish)
 Discography with texts
 Short biography and discography
 Pictures from a concert in American Czech-Slovak Cultural Club in June 2003
 Photo from the Moscow concert in Central House of Artist on 7 May 2010

1953 births
Living people
Musicians from Ostrava
Czech folk singers
20th-century Czech male singers
People from Cieszyn Silesia
Czech songwriters
Czech guitarists
Male guitarists
Czech accordionists
People of the StB
Recipients of Medal of Merit (Czech Republic)
21st-century accordionists
21st-century Czech male singers
Czechoslovak male singers